Brent Krahn (born April 2, 1982) is a Canadian former professional ice hockey goaltender. He was drafted ninth overall by the Calgary Flames in the 2000 NHL Entry Draft and played a single game in the National Hockey League for the Dallas Stars.

Playing career
Brent Krahn enjoyed a very successful junior hockey career with the WHL's Calgary Hitmen before being drafted in the first round by Calgary in the 2000 NHL Entry Draft. A highly regarded prospect at the time, he was the second goaltender selected in the draft, after Rick DiPietro, who was selected first overall. He subsequently spent time in the American Hockey League with the San Antonio Rampage, Lowell Lock Monsters, Omaha Ak-Sar-Ben Knights, and the Quad City Flames. A recurring knee injury seriously hampered his development at the professional level, and Krahn is now widely regarded as a draft bust.
 
Following the 2007-2008 NHL season and after 8 years of development in the Flames organization, the team made the decision to not re-sign Krahn, and he became an unrestricted free agent. He was signed by the Dallas Stars on September 24, 2008.  Beginning the season with the AHL's Chicago Wolves, Krahn was recalled by the Stars in February 2009, and made his NHL debut on February 14 in relief of starter Marty Turco against the Chicago Blackhawks.

Krahn played for the Texas Stars of the AHL from 2009 until 2011. After the 2010-2011 regular season it was announced that he had been left off the Stars' Clear-Day roster and was therefore ineligible for the AHL playoffs. 

He currently works at Pembina Pipelines.

Career statistics

See also
List of players who played only one game in the NHL

References

External links
 

1982 births
Calgary Flames draft picks
Calgary Hitmen players
Canadian ice hockey goaltenders
Chicago Wolves players
Dallas Stars players
Las Vegas Wranglers players
Living people
Lowell Lock Monsters players
National Hockey League first-round draft picks
Omaha Ak-Sar-Ben Knights players
Quad City Flames players
San Antonio Rampage players
Seattle Thunderbirds players
Ice hockey people from Winnipeg
Texas Stars players